Donald Nicholl (August 9, 1925 – July 5, 1980) was an English-American screenwriter and producer. His production company Nicholl Ross West (with Mickey Ross and Bernie West) wrote for the situation comedies All in the Family, The Jeffersons, and produced The Dumplings, Three's Company, and The Ropers.

Nicholl was born in Sunderland, England. He worked as a journalist, columnist, and publicist in England, and moved to the United States in 1968. His widow Gee set up the Don and Gee Nicholl Fellowships in Screenwriting program after his death.

References

External links

Nicholl Fellowships in Screenwriting via Academy of Motion Picture Arts and Sciences

1925 births
1980 deaths
American male screenwriters
American film producers
People from Sunderland
20th-century American businesspeople
British emigrants to the United States
English journalists
English male screenwriters
English film producers
20th-century American male writers
20th-century American screenwriters
20th-century English screenwriters
20th-century English male writers
20th-century English businesspeople